Give Us a Break is a British comedy drama television series which was originally broadcast on BBC One in a series of seven episodes between 22 September an 3 November 1983 with a feature-length Christmas Special the following year.

Synopsis
A London wheeler dealer is extremely put out at having to look after his girlfriend's younger brother from Liverpool. Things change, however, when he discovers that he is a snooker prodigy.

Main cast
 Robert Lindsay as Micky Noades
 Paul McGann as Mo Morris
 Shirin Taylor as Tina
 David Daker as Ron Palmer
 Ron Pember as Bobby Weeks
 Alan Ford as Nobby Wilson
 David Sibley as Billy Wilson
 Johnny Shannon as Lenny Stone
 Tony Selby as Benny
 Julian Holloway as Dave Nelson
 John Forgeham as Brindly
 William Simons as Tommy Buck
 David Jackson as Stitch Peters
 Bill Wallis as Jack Hobson
 Victoria Burgoyne as Nancy
 Walter Sparrow as Alan Clegg 
 Alphonsia Emmanuel as Pat

References

Bibliography
 Perry, Chris. The Kaleidoscope British Christmas Television Guide 1937-2013. 2017.
 Vahimagi, Tise. British Television: An Illustrated Guide. Oxford University Press, 1996.

External links
 

The End!

1983 British television series debuts
1984 British television series endings
1980s British comedy-drama television series
English-language television shows
Television shows set in London